Hsu Kuo-yung (born 7 June 1958) is a Taiwanese politician. He was a member of the Legislative Yuan from 2005 to 2008, and again in 2016. Hsu succeeded Yeh Jiunn-rong as Minister of Interior in July 2018.

Education
Hsu obtained his bachelor's degree in law from National Chung Hsing University.

Political careers

2008 legislative election
Eligible voters: 280,614
Total votes cast  (Ratio): 171,665 (61.17%)
Valid Votes  (Ratio): 169,272 (98.61%)
Invalid Votes   (Ratio): 2,393 (1.39%)

References

External links
 

1958 births
Living people
Members of the 6th Legislative Yuan
Members of the 9th Legislative Yuan
Taipei Members of the Legislative Yuan
Party List Members of the Legislative Yuan
Taiwanese Ministers of the Interior
Democratic Progressive Party Members of the Legislative Yuan
Taipei City Councilors
National Chung Hsing University alumni